is a Japanese light novel series written by Tsukasa Kōzuki, with accompanying illustrations by Munyū. The series includes 13 novels released between September 2006 and March 2012, published by ASCII Media Works under their Dengeki Bunko imprint. A manga adaptation by the illustrator group Nekoyashiki-Nekomaru was serialized in ASCII Media Works' Dengeki Moeoh magazine between the June 2008 and December 2008 issues. A drama CD based on the novels was released in September 2009. A 12-episode anime adaptation produced by Xebec and directed by Atsushi Ōtsuki aired in Japan between January and March 2010. The anime has been licensed by Media Blasters for release in North America.

Plot
Akiharu Hino lost his parents when he was young and was adopted into his uncle's family. He decides to enter a boarding school, Hakureiryō Academy, because he no longer wants to burden his relatives. He decides to take the exam for that school and succeeds in entering the House Management Department, where the school trains servants for high society. He wants to become a butler, but his delinquent appearance frightens the girls, who make up the majority of the students. Being unable to get along with his classmates, Akiharu meets his childhood friend Tomomi Saikyō, a girl with a two-faced character who traumatized him many times when they were kids. Another girl named Selnia Iori Flameheart chases after him because of his looks and calls him suspicious. Still, Akiharu starts finding his feet at the school and his relationships with the girls also get better.

Characters

Servant-ed class

The main protagonist of the story, he is considered to be a delinquent because of his red eyes and rough appearance (accented by a scar bisecting his left eyebrow). In contrast to his appearance, he has a caring personality, but is dense in regards to girls and matters of love. Because of everyone's less than friendly perception of him, he is often (falsely) accused of perverted acts. He was tormented by his childhood friend Tomomi when they were younger and now that they have become reacquainted, Tomomi is often behind the schemes leading to these misunderstandings.

He is well aware of Tomomi's convincing manipulative nature and devilish personality but is resigned to dealing with her pranks because she knows so much about him as a child that she is effectively blackmailing him into keeping quiet about her. On the brighter side, she tells him that she will help him through to graduation, perhaps because she subconsciously cares for him or, more likely, simply because she enjoys how much more fun she can have at school with him around.

Akiharu's roommate and fellow servant-ed student. Kaoru is actually a cross-dressing girl (because of a strict father, who told her to graduate from Hakureiryō as a man). She has many fans in the upper-ed section and is easily mistaken to be a boy because of her small bust and short hair. She is rather cold to Akiharu at first, but slowly opens up to him. She is always worried that her real gender will be exposed, especially with sharing a room with Akiharu. She is simultaneously relieved and rather upset when Akiharu sees her naked from the waist up and shows no reaction (due to her flat chest). She has unconsciously developed feelings for Akiharu, something she realized when responding to a love letter from a female student. She holds a black belt in an unspecified martial art and is implied to be the daughter of a dojo, as shown in a flashback.

A clumsy maid at the academy who causes Akiharu much trouble. She has an older sister, Saori, in upper-ed. She used to be in upper-ed herself, but because of her family falling on hard times, she was forced to transfer to servant-ed. She is very inept at the tasks typically required of a maid and usually ends up making a mess of things.

A member of the academy's servant-ed class and one of the few boys in the entire school. He is an outright pervert who admits that he only came to Hakureiryō because the girls who go to this school are either beautiful maids-in-training or high class ladies from prominent families. His perversion almost always causes him to sexually harass women and therefore invoke the wrath of Mikan.

A member of the academy's servant-ed class and one of the few boys in the entire school. He is rather a darling of the ladies in the servant-ed class.

Upper-ed class

Tomomi is an upper-ed student at the academy and is also Akiharu's childhood friend. Her polite and refined attitude serves as a front to hide her true self: a manipulative deceiver. Her surname was Suzuhashi before her mother got remarried. She entertains herself by preying on other students (especially Akiharu and Selnia) by putting them in compromising situations (e.g. groping, sexual harassment and nudity). Tomomi is perfectly willing to withhold information from everyone (as in the case of the Hino-Khadim scandal when she decided to keep silent despite having found out the Khadim family rules, only revealing what she knew when things were starting to get too complicated). In some cases she involves others in her schemes to achieve certain ends (as when she assigned Hino to stay with Mimina for a day in order to inspire her to draw). According to Akiharu, she is highly intelligent and also dislikes losing to other people. In the anime, a characteristic high-pitched giggle accompanied by a shadow and dark expression on her face signify that she is thinking evil thoughts. While on a date with her, Akiharu reveals that, despite her constant bullying in elementary school, he had in fact had a crush on her and his dream then had been to marry her when they grew up, which surprised and embarrassed Tomomi, perhaps showing that she reciprocates these feelings. This is further corroborated by her becoming jealous after seeing Selnia and Akiharu kiss.

As an upper-ed student at the academy, Selnia is extremely proud of her status as scion of the Flameheart family. She is often the unfortunate target of the various misunderstandings involving Akiharu that are purposely caused by fellow student Tomomi Saikyo. While outwardly harsh and condescending towards Hino like assault, she continually expresses concern for him when he finds himself in less-than-desirable situations, though this is usually followed a blunt lecture or unnecessary violence. Her hairstyle is the reason why Akiharu refers to her as "Drill" (which upsets her). In the anime, her hair spins and make sounds similar to a drill whenever she is upset. She is shown to have strong feelings for Akiharu, exemplified in her kissing him and her rivalry with Tomomi for his affection. Even though she outwardly denies feeling anything for Akiharu, she does in fact realize and accept how she feels.

She is the princess of a small country who transferred to Japan largely because of her love of anime. She openly asserts her pride in being an anime otaku, and has contempt for Japanese youths who can name any foreign opera or composer, yet do not even know the names of current anime in their own country. She is quite lonely since she has no one to talk to about anime, cosplay, or other otaku hobbies (other than the principal who shares her interests). She speaks in an "archaic dialect", mixing in words like  and adding  at the end of sentences.

She is a 19 year-old student who appears to be about 10 due to an illness, which has kept her in hospital for most of her life. She developed her talent for drawing to stave off boredom in the hospital and has become quite talented but she hates having to draw for the sake of others, wanting to only draw what she likes. Although she dislikes Akiharu at first, she starts to develop feelings for him when he stands up for her, telling other students that she draws for her own pleasure, not theirs, and to let her draw whatever she wants to.

She is very shy foreign student who hardly talks to anyone but her bodyguard. When Akiharu unintentionally walks in on her while she is changing in a classroom, her bodyguard immediately tries to kill him due to her family's customs that a man who sees a woman's skin must either marry her or be killed. When Ayse stops her bodyguard from killing Akiharu, he is immediately named as Ayse's fiancé. Unknown to everyone else who tries to break the engagement, Ayse is in love with Akiharu and wants to marry him regardless of her family's customs. She confesses to him and has resolved to wait for him to come to love and choose her.

Suiran is one of Selnia's closest friends who was born and raised in China until she enrolled at Hakureiryō. At times she utters Chinese words and wears the qipao on occasion.

She is the elder of the Shikikagami sisters but unlike her younger sister, she is an upper-ed student at the academy, having paid the required fees before their family fell on hard times. She is as ditzy as her younger sister although, unlike Sanae, her misadventures result in her perverted states of undress as she has a habit of taking her clothes off without minding where she is or who is present when she undresses.

She is Ayse's ever-loyal bodyguard who faithfully protects and defends her mistress with a lethal-looking scimitar. When Hino accidentally saw Ayse naked, Hedyeh hounded him until Ayse gave up on him. Hedyeh tends to be extremely violent, acting before thinking; while she normally talks in a husky, low tone, her voice becomes quickly high-pitched when she is sufficiently agitated or is thinking of violence. She is always at Ayse's side.

The only male member of the academy's upper-ed class. He considers himself as the most beautiful man and as such proclaims that he should be admired by everybody. Ironically, students usually avoid him because of this. His real name is actually Daikiji.

Others

Hakureiryō Academy's principal whose hobbies include playing eroge even at work. Her otaku tendencies tend to get in the way of her work, and cause her react to situations like characters in her games do which usually leads to more misunderstandings. She is often reprimanded by Mikan, whom she is afraid of, and who strives to keep her focused on more serious matters. Kaede also sponsors the anime "Magical Diva" and as such has a large collection of items related to the anime including the original manuscript. She would like to discuss anime with Pina more than she already does, but is unable to do so easily because of Mikan, who keeps a close eye on her.

The academy's head instructor who oversees almost all matters related to the school. She is known for her mastery of all subjects related to becoming a maid or butler. She has a strict and cold demeanor, particularly towards anyone who slacks off and as such, the students, and even the principal herself, avoid provoking her wrath. She throws fountain pens with deadly accuracy much as a ninja uses throwing knives.

The head maid of the Flameheart family household. She is very close to Selnia and has watched over her since birth.

Media

Light novels
Ladies versus Butlers! began as a series of light novels written by Tsukasa Kōzuki, with accompanying illustrations by Munyū. ASCII Media Works published 13 novels under their Dengeki Bunko imprint between September 10, 2006 and March 10, 2012.

Manga
A manga adaptation by the illustrator group Nekoyashiki-Nekomaru was serialized in ASCII Media Works' Dengeki Moeoh seinen manga magazine between the June 2008 and December 2008 issues. A single tankōbon volume was released on December 18, 2009 under ASCII Media Works' Dengeki Comics imprint.

Drama CD
An hour-long drama CD based on the novels was released by ASCII Media Works on September 8, 2009. The drama CD was bundled with a booklet featuring material written by Tsukasa Kōzuki and illustrated by Munyū, a leaflet describing the characters, a small collection of rough sketches, and a set of postcards. The CD features three episodes, the second of which is an original story for the drama CD. The voice cast of the drama CD is the same as with the anime adaptation.

Internet radio show
An Internet radio show to promote the anime series and other Ladies versus Butlers! media called  aired 31 episodes between September 28, 2009 and May 31, 2010 hosted on the anime's official website. The show was streamed online every other Monday, and was hosted by Mai Goto and Mariya Ise who voice Pina Sufolmuclan Estoh and Kaede Tenjōji in the anime, respectively. The show's theme song is  sung by Goto and Ise.

Anime
A 12-episode anime television series produced by Xebec and directed by Atsushi Ōtsuki aired in Japan between January 5 and March 23, 2010 on AT-X. The first episode was given a special early broadcast on December 29, 2009 on AT-X. Six short bonus specials are included with the Blu-ray Discs. The anime was licensed by Media Blasters in North America, who released it on Blu-ray and DVD on November 3, 2015. The series premiered on Toku in the United States in January 2016.

Episode list

References

External links
Ladies versus Butlers! at ASCII Media Works 
Anime official website 
Ladies versus Butlers! at Xebec 

2006 Japanese novels
2008 manga
2010 anime television series debuts
Anime and manga based on light novels
Anime Works
Cross-dressing in anime and manga
Dengeki Bunko
Dengeki Comics
Harem anime and manga
IG Port franchises
Light novels
NBCUniversal Entertainment Japan
Romantic comedy anime and manga
School life in anime and manga
Seinen manga
Television shows based on light novels
Xebec (studio)